Lathrobiina is a subtribe of rove beetles.

Genera
 Acalophaena
 Achenium
 Attaxenus
 Dacnochilus
 Domene
 Dysanabatium
 Enallagium
 Ganarus
 Lathrobium
 Lobrathium
 Micrillus
 Neoscimbalium
 Notobium
 Paederopsis
 Paulianidia
 Phanophilus
 Platybrathium
 Platydomene
 Pseudobium
 Pseudolathra
 Scymbalium
 Scymbalopsis
 Sterocephalus
 Sucoca
 Tetartopeus
 Throbalium
 Tripectenopus

References

Insect subtribes
Paederinae